Himura (written: 日村) is a Japanese surname. Notable people with the surname include:

, Japanese comedian

Fictional characters
Himura Kenshin, a character in the Rurouni Kenshin, and father of Himura Kenji in the story
Himura Kenji, a character in Rurouni Kenshin, and son of Himura Kenshin in the story
Himura Izumi, a character in the YA novel Ink and Bone by Rachel Caine
Himura Rei, a character in My Hero Academia.

Japanese-language surnames